Battle Rap Stars is a mobile rap battle game for iOS created by Jump Shot Media that uses inputted audio to evaluate and score.

In Battle Rap Stars, gamers must battle rap against pre-recorded rappers featured in the game.  Rappers featured in the game include Paul Wall, Mistah F.A.B., Hopsin, J Peezy and Fresh Caesar.
 The criteria required to beat each round gets harder as users progress through the game.  The more in rhythm the user is with the beat, the higher the score.

See also
 Karaoke Revolution
 SingStar
 Def Jam Rapstar

References

External links

 
 Battle Rap Stars at Facebook
 Battle Rap Stars at Twitter

2011 video games
IOS games
Mobile games
Music video games
Social casual games
Video games based on real people
Video games developed in the United States
Video games set in the United States